First Family of Hip Hop is an American reality television series that premiered on the Bravo cable network, on January 15, 2017, and ended on March 19. The show follows the life of the family of late Sylvia Robinson.

Cast
 Leland Robinson, Sr.
 Leland Robinson, Jr.
 Rhondo Robinson, Jr.
 Darnell Robinson
 Kasin Robinson
 LeA Robinson
 Antonio Jordan
 Eseni Ellington
 Shanell "Lady Luck" Jones
 Somaya Reece
 Sasha Robinson

Broadcast
The series premiered in Australia on Arena on February 27, 2017.

References

External links 
 
 

2010s American reality television series
2017 American television series debuts
2017 American television series endings
Bravo (American TV network) original programming
English-language television shows